"In My Arms Tonight" is the 5th single by Zard and released 9 September 1992 under B-Gram Records label. It was released one month after previous single "Nemurenai Yoru wo Daite" and one week after album "Hold Me". The single debuted at #9 rank first week. It charted for 13 weeks and sold over 322,000 copies.

Track list
All songs are written by Izumi Sakai.
In My Arms Tonight
composer: Michiya Haruhata (Tube)/arrangement: Masao Akashi
the song was used in TBS drama Gakkou ga Abunai as theme song

composer: Toshiya Matsukawa/arrangement: Masazumi Ozawa (Pamelah) and Daisuke Ikeda
In My Arms Tonight (original karaoke)
 (original karaoke)

References

1992 singles
Zard songs
Songs written by Izumi Sakai
1992 songs
Songs written by Michiya Haruhata
Song recordings produced by Daiko Nagato